Melrose, California may refer to:
Melrose District, Los Angeles, California
Melrose, California, former name of Cherokee, Nevada County, California
Melrose Hill, Los Angeles, California
Melrose, Oakland, California